Oxyna utahensis is a species of fruit fly in the family Tephritidae.

Distribution
USA & Canada.

References

Tephritinae
Insects described in 1949
Diptera of North America